The Honda CB125R is a 125cc motorcycle introduced by the Japanese company Honda in 2018.  It is a  naked bike that can be ridden with a European A1 license.
 

The CB125R is a member of Honda's "Neo Sports Café" model family, which also includes the CB1000R, CB650R, CB300R and the CB150R.

Specifications

MY 2021- 
For 2021, Honda unveiled a revised CB125R with a new 11kW (14.75bhp) 4-valve Euro 5 compliant motor. The new motor makes 11.6Nm peak torque. Up front the 2021 CB125R has 41mm Showa Separate Function Big Piston (SFF-BP) USD forks. The 2021 model is slightly heavier at 129.8kg.

MY 2018-2020 
Many features have been adopted by other larger-displacement Honda models, but the CB125R weighs less, namely 125.8kg, and the revised Honda CBR125R with liquid-cooled single-cylinder engine, brings smoothness and revving and enables powerful acceleration even in the low to medium speed range. Its power is brought to the rear wheel via a 6-speed gearbox. The Honda CB125R produces 13.1bhp of maximum power at 10,000rpm and 10Nm of peak torque at 8,000rpm. It comes with a 296mm disc brake at the front wheel and a 220mm disc brake at the rear wheel. The CB125R is equipped with dual-channel ABS with IMU.

The frame is equipped with sturdy panels for swinging and the chassis geometry allows high stability while agile handling and best feedback. The steering head angle and the caster are 24.2° and 90.2mm. The balanced load distribution ensures good feedback from the front wheel and pleasant steering behavior. The bike is 126kg, whereby the arrangement of the components was very centered, so that the center of gravity is far ahead. Diameter comes from Showa and harmonizes with the motorcycle.

References 

CB125R
Standard motorcycles
Motorcycles introduced in 2018